During the 1976 Summer Olympics in Montreal, Quebec, Canada, Egypt, along with many other countries, boycotted due to the participation of New Zealand, who still had sporting links with South Africa.

Athletes from Egypt, Cameroon, Morocco, and Tunisia competed on 18–20 July before these nations withdrew from the Games.

Results by event

Basketball

Men's team competition
lost to  103-64
Team roster
Sayed Aboul Dahab
Mohamed Essam Khaled
Mohamed Khaled El Said
Fathi Mohamed Kamel
Hamdi El Seoudi
Mohamed Hanafi El Gohari
Ahmed El Saharti
Ismail Mohamed Aly Selim
Medhat Mohsen Warda
Osman Hassan Farid
Mohamed Hamdi Osman
Awad Abdel Nabi
Head coach: Fouad Aboulkheir

Boxing
Light Flyweight
Said Mohamed Abdelwahab
defeated  in first round (referee stopped match at 1:59 1st round)
Flyweight
Said Ahmed Elashry
defeated  in first round (5-0)
Bantamweight
Abdelnabi Elsayed Mahran

Weightlifting

Flyweight
Mustafa Aly
Snatch: 90.0 kg (15th place)
Clean and jerk: missed all 3 attempts
Bantamweight
Ahmed Mashall
Snatch: 90.0 kg (19th place)
Clean and jerk: 127.5 kg (14th place)
Total: 217.5 kg (14th place)

References
Official Olympic Reports

Nations at the 1976 Summer Olympics
1976 Summer Olympics
Olympics